William Holgill was Archdeacon of Carlisle from 1532 until 1540.

Holgill was Rector of Great Salkeld and  Prebendary of South Cave in York Minster.

References

Archdeacons of Carlisle
Alumni of the University of Cambridge
16th-century English people